Events in the year 1892 in music.

Specific locations
1892 in Norwegian music

Events 
April 28 – Jean Sibelius conducts the world première of his Kullervo Symphony in Helsinki.
May 26 – A statue of Felix Mendelssohn, by Werner Stein, is dedicated at St. Thomas Church, Leipzig. Removed by the Nazis in the 1930s, it is re-dedicated in 2008.
September 24 – Opening of the Theater Unter den Linden, Berlin with Adolf Ferron's operetta Daphne and Gaul and Haßreiter's ballet Die Welt in Bild und Tanz.
September 26 – Antonín Dvořák arrives in the United States to take up his post as artistic director of the National Conservatory of Music.
December 18
Anton Bruckner's Symphony No. 8 in C minor is premiered by the Vienna Philharmonic with Hans Richter conducting at the Stadttheater, Leipzig.
December 6 O.S. – Pyotr Ilyich Tchaikovsky's ballet The Nutcracker and opera Iolanta are premiered in a double bill at the Imperial Mariinsky Theatre in Saint Petersburg, Russia.
"After the Ball" becomes the first sheet music to sell over 1 million copies (for a single publisher in a single year).
Erik Satie composes his first pieces in his own compositional system.
Sergei Diaghilev graduates from the Saint Petersburg Conservatory.
Ferdinand Praeger's controversial biography Wagner As I Knew Him is published posthumously in London.
Sudrophone patented by François Sudre in France.

Published popular music 

 "After the Ball"     w.m. Charles K. Harris
 "The Bowery"     w. Charles H. Hoyt m. Percy Gaunt
 "Daddy Wouldn't Buy Me a Bow Wow"     w.m. Joseph Tabrar
 "Daisy Bell" (aka "A Bicycle Built For Two")     w.m. Harry Dacre
 "Flanagan"  w.m. C. W. Murphy & William Letters
 "Future Mrs. 'Awkins" by Albert Chevalier
 "The Holy City"     w. Frederick Edward Weatherly m. Stephen Adams
 "La Sultana Turkish March" m. Fred Linden
 "Liebestraum Nocturne" m. Virginia Field
 "Molly And I And The Baby"     w.m. Harry Kennedy
 "My Old Dutch"     w. Albert Chevalier m. Charles Ingle
 "My Sweetheart's The Man In The Moon"     w.m. James Thornton
 "The Sweetest Story Ever Told"     w.m. R. M. Stults
 "The Virginia Skedaddle" w.m. Monroe H. Rosenfeld

Recorded popular music 
"Daddy Wouldn't Buy Me a Bow-wow " – Dan W. Quinn
"Daddy Wouldn't Buy Me a Bow-wow " – Silas Leachman
"Esquimeau Dance" – William Tuson
"Grover Cleveland March" – Gilmore's Band 
"Michael Casey At The Telephone" – Russell Hunting
"Michael Casey Taking The Census" – Russell Hunting
"Pat Brady as President" – Dan Kelly
"Parody of "We'll Never Turn His Picture Toward The Wall'" – Al Reeves
"Riding through the Glen" – Issler's Orchestra
"Take Your Time Gentlemen" – Press Eldridge
"The Blind Boy" – Richard Jose
"The Bowery" – Dan W. Quinn
"The Laughing Darkie" – George W. Johnson (singer)
"The Night Alarm" – Holding's Military Band 
"The Old Folks at Home" – Len Spencer
"Uncle Ned's Dream" – George W. Johnson (singer)

Classical music
Johannes Brahms – Intermezzos Opus number 117
Edward Elgar – Serenade for Strings, Op. 20
Alexander Glazunov – String Quintet in A major (Opus 39)
Gustav Mahler – Das himmlische Leben (later incorporated into his fourth symphony)
Miguel Marqués – El Centinelo
Carl Nielsen – First Symphony
Joseph Parry – Saul of Tarsus (oratorio)
Sergei Rachmaninoff
Prelude in C-sharp Minor
Piano Concerto No. 1 in F-sharp minor, Op. 1
Max Reger
Cello Sonata No. 1, Op. 5
Twelve Waltz-Caprices, Op. 9, four-hand piano
20 German Dances, Op. 10, four-hand piano
Alexander Scriabin – Piano Sonata No. 1 in F minor, opus 6
Jean Sibelius – Kullervo Symphony
Josef Suk – Serenade for Strings in E-flat major
Alexander von Zemlinsky – Symphony in D minor

Opera
Herman Bemberg – Elaine
Karel Bendl – Dite Tabora
Alfredo Catalani – La Wally
Gialdino Gialdini – I due soci premiered February 24 at the Teatro Brunetti, Bologna
Umberto Giordano – Mala Vita
Isidore de Lara – The Light of Asia
Ruggiero Leoncavallo – I Pagliacci
Jules Massenet – Werther (Composed 1887)
Adolf Neuendorff – The Minstrel
Pyotr Ilyich Tchaikovsky – Iolanta
 The World's Fair Colored Opera Company, with featured singer, soprano Matilda Sissieretta Jones are the first African-American performers to appear at Carnegie Hall

Ballet
Pyotr Ilyich Tchaikovsky – The Nutcracker

Musical theater
Blue-Eyed Susan, libretto by George Robert Sims, on London stage
 "Maid Marian" (retitled version of "Robin Hood"); London production
 "Maid Marian" (sequel to "Robin Hood"); Broadway production
The Wicklow Postman; initial production in Boston, Massachusetts

Top hits 
 "Slide, Kelly, Slide" by George J. Gaskin
 "Sally in Our Alley" by Manhansett Quartette

Births 
 January 1 – Artur Rodziński, Polish conductor (d. 1958)
 January 31 – Eddie Cantor, born Isidore Itzkowitz, American singer and entertainer (d. 1964)
 February 4 – Yrjö Kilpinen, Finnish composer known most for his lieder (d. 1959)
 February 15 – Ján Valašťan Dolinský, Slovak composer (d. 1965)
 March 10 
Arthur Honegger, composer (d. 1955)
Eva Turner, operatic soprano (d. 1990)
 March 27 – Ferde Grofé, composer (d. 1972)
 April 1 – Renato Zanelli, Chilean baritone, later tenor (d. 1935)
 April 2 – Roy Palmer, jazz trombonist (d. 1962)
 April 10 – Victor de Sabata, conductor and composer (d. 1967)
 April 12 – Johnny Dodds, jazz clarinetist (d. 1940)
 April 15 – Manuel Quiroga, violinist (d. 1961)
 April 19 – Germaine Tailleferre, composer (d. 1983)
 April 21 – Jaroslav Kvapil, composer (d. 1958)
 May 14 – Arthur Lourié, Russian-born expatriate composer (d. 1966)
 May 18 – Ezio Pinza, Italian bass singer and actor (d. 1957)
 May 19 – Pops Foster, jazz bass player (d. 1969)
 June 6 – Ted Lewis, singer and bandleader (d. 1971)
 June 18 – Eduard Steuermann, pianist (d. 1964)
 June 21 – Hilding Rosenberg, Swedish composer (d. 1985)
 June 23 – Mieczysław Horszowski, Polish pianist (d. 1993)
 June 30 – László Lajtha, Hungarian symphonist (d. 1963)
 July 2 – Jack Hylton, British bandleader (d. 1965)
 July 8 – J. Russel Robinson, dixieland pianist-composer (d. 1963)
 July 10 – Ján Móry, Slovak composer (d. 1978)
 July 26 – Philipp Jarnach, composer of German-French origins (d. 1982)
 August 14 – Kaikhosru Shapurji Sorabji, composer, music critic and pianist (d. 1988)
 August 15 – Knud Jeppesen, musicologist (d. 1974)
 September 4 – Darius Milhaud, composer (d. 1974)
 September 5 – Joseph Szigeti, violinist (d. 1973)
 September 17 – Hendrik Andriessen, Dutch composer and organist (d. 1981)
 October 17 – Herbert Howells, church music composer (d. 1983)
 October 19 – Ilmari Hannikainen, composer (d. 1955)
October 25 – Janszieka (Jennie) Deutsch and Roszicka (Rosie) Deutsch, Hungarian-born dancers, actresses and singers, billed as the Dolly sisters (d. 1941 and 1970 respectively)
November 28 – Thomas Wood, English composer (d. 1950)
December 9 – Beatrice Harrison, cellist (d. 1965)
December 11 – Giacomo Lauri-Volpi, operatic tenor (d. 1979)

Deaths 
January 10 – Heinrich Dorn, German conductor, composer and journalist (born 1804)
February 13 – Lambert Massart, violinist (born 1811)
February 20 – Róza Csillag, opera singer (born 1832)
March 11 – Caroline Reinagle, pianist, composer and writer (born 1818)
March 20 – Arthur Goring Thomas, composer (born 1850) (suicide)
April 22 – Édouard Lalo, composer (born 1823)
May 2 – Wilhelm Rust, composer (born 1822)
May 6 – Ernest Guiraud, composer (born 1837)
June 5 – Robert Rees, Welsh tenor (born 1841)
August 18 – Jules Perrot, ballet dancer (born 1810)
August 19 – František Zdeněk Skuherský, composer, teacher and music theorist (born 1830)
September 5 – Henry Christian Timm, pianist, conductor and composer (born 1811)
September 24 – Patrick Gilmore, bandmaster and composer (born 1829)
October 24 – Robert Franz, composer (born 1815)
October 28 – Felix Otto Dessoff, conductor and composer (born 1835)
November 4 – Hervé, organist and composer (born 1825)
November 19 – Antonio Torres Jurado, guitar maker (born 1817)
date unknown – Adolf Rzepko, Polish composer, oboist, choral and orchestral conductor and pianist (born 1825)

References

 
19th century in music
Music by year
1890s in music